Salda is a village in Yeşilova District of Burdur Province, Turkey. Its population is 1,083 (2021). Before the 2013 reorganisation, it was a town (belde). It is situated on the coast of Lake Salda. Both the town and the lake are named after Salda creek at the south of the town.

References

Villages in Yeşilova District